The Roman scudo (plural: scudi romani) was the currency of the Papal States until 1866. It was subdivided into 100 baiocchi (singular: baiocco), each of 5 quattrini (singular: quattrino). Other denominations included the grosso of 5 baiocchi, the carlino of  baiocchi, the giulio and paoli both of 10 baiocchi, the testone of 30 baiocchi and the doppia of 3 scudi.

History

In addition to issues for the Papal States as a whole, the currency was also issued by many of the individual municipalities. In the late 18th century, this included issues from Ancona, Ascoli, Bologna, Civitavecchia, Fano, Fermo, Foligno, Gubbio, Macerata, Matelica, Montalto, Pergola, Perugia, Ronciglione, San Severino, Spoleto, Terni, Tivoli and Viterbo. Uniquely in Bologna the baiocco, also known as the bolognino, was subdivided into 6 quattrini.

Between 1798 and 1799, the revolutionary French forces established the Roman Republic, which issued coins denominated in baiocco and scudo. In addition, the municipalities of Ancona, Civitavecchia, Clitunno, Foligno, Gubbio, Pergola and Perugia issued coins in the name of the Roman Republic.

In 1808, the Papal States were annexed by France, and the French franc circulated officially. When the Pope's authority was restored in 1814, the scudo was restored as the currency. However, outside Rome solely the coinage of Bologna was resumed. In 1849, another Roman Republic was established which issued coins centrally and in Ancona.

In 1866, the scudo was replaced by the lira, equivalent to the Italian lira, allowing the participation to the Latin Monetary Union. The exchange rate used was 5.375 lire = 1 scudo.

Coins

The individual states issued similar coinages, with the exception of Bologna, which additionally issued silver 12 baiocchi,  scudo and 80 bolognini, and gold 2, 5 and 10 zecchini. The 1798 to 1799 Roman Republic issued copper , 1, 2 and 5 baiocchi and silver 1 scudo.

After the restoration of the currency, billon coins were no longer issued and several other denominations disappeared. There were copper 1 quattrino,  and 1 baiocco, silver 1 grosso, 1 and 2 giulio and 1 scudo, and gold 1 doppia. The silver testone was reintroduced in 1830, followed by 50 baiocchi in 1832.

In 1835, a new coinage was introduced which abandoned all the denomination names except for the quattrino, baiocco and scudo. Copper coins were issued in denominations of 1 quattrino,  and 1 baiocco, with silver 5, 10, 20, 30 and 50 baiocchi and 1 scudo, and gold , 5 and 10 scudi. In 1849, the Roman Republic issued a coinage consisting of copper , 1 and 3 baiocchi and silver 4, 8, 16 and 40 baiocchi. Following the restoration of the Papal States, copper 2 and 5 baiocchi were introduced.

Banknotes

From 1785, paper money was issued by the Santo Monte Della Pietà di Roma in denominations from 3 scudi up to 1500 scudi, while, from 1786, the Banco di Santo Spirito di Roma issued notes from 3 scudi up to 3000 scudi. The 1798 to 1799 Roman Republic issued notes in various denominations including 3 and 40 baiocchi, 8, 9 and 10 paoli. The treasury of the Papal States issued notes during the 19th century.

See also

Papal mint
Maltese scudo
Escudo

Notes

References

External links
 Rome's old coinage

Currencies of Italy
Currencies of Vatican City
Modern obsolete currencies
Scudo
1866 disestablishments in the Papal States
Escudo